David Robinson (1 August 1944 – 29 September 2022) was an English professional rugby league footballer who played in the 1960s and 1970s.

Background
Dave Robinson was a pupil at Moorside Secondary Modern School in his hometown of Swinton, near Manchester.

Playing career
Robinson signed for Swinton in May 1963, making his first team debut in March 1964 and stayed with the club until January 1970 when he was transferred to Wigan.  During this period with Swinton he played  in the 11–2 victory over Leigh in the 1969 Lancashire Cup Final  at Central Park, Wigan on Saturday 1 November 1969.

Robinson spent six years at Wigan including appearing in a Challenge Cup final defeat to Castleford in his first season at Wigan and a defeat to St Helens in the Championship Final in the following season. He was part of the team that won the 1973 Lancashire Cup beating Salford 19–9 in the Finalat Wilderspool Stadium, Warrington, on Saturday 13 October 1973.

In February 1976 Robinson returned to Swinton before retiring from the game in March 1977.

International honours
Robinson won a cap for England while at Swinton in 1969 against Wales, and won caps for Great Britain while at Swinton in 1965 against New Zealand, in 1966 against France (2 matches), on the 1966 Great Britain Lions tour against Australia (3 matches), New Zealand (2 matches), in 1967 against France (2 matches), Australia (2 matches), and while at Wigan in 1970 against Australia.

References

External links

1944 births
2022 deaths
England national rugby league team players
English rugby league players
Great Britain national rugby league team players
Lancashire rugby league team players
Rugby league locks
Rugby league players from Swinton, Greater Manchester
Rugby league second-rows
Swinton Lions players
Wigan Warriors players